Ribonuclease T2 (ribonuclease II, base-non-specific ribonuclease, nonbase-specific RNase, RNase (non-base specific), non-base specific ribonuclease, nonspecific RNase, RNase Ms, RNase M, RNase II, Escherichia coli ribonuclease II, ribonucleate nucleotido-2'-transferase (cyclizing), acid ribonuclease, RNAase CL, Escherichia coli ribonuclease I' ribonuclease PP2, ribonuclease N2, ribonuclease M, acid RNase, ribonnuclease (non-base specific), ribonuclease (non-base specific), RNase T2, ribonuclease PP3, ribonucleate 3'-oligonucleotide hydrolase, ribonuclease U4) is an enzyme. It is a type of endoribonuclease. This enzyme catalyses the following chemical reaction

 Two-stage endonucleolytic cleavage to nucleoside 3'-phosphates and 3'-phosphooligonucleotides with 2',3'-cyclic phosphate intermediates

See also 
RNASET2

References

External links 

EC 3.1.27